Anona Pak (born 29 November 1993) is a New Zealand badminton player. She was the women's doubles runner-up at the Waikato International tournament partnered with Vicki Copeland. She also received 2016 Massey University Manawatu sportswoman of the year at the Massey Blues Sports Awards, because of her success won the national championships in woman's doubles and mixed doubles. She was three times women's doubles bronze medalists at the Oceania Championships.

Achievements

Oceania Championships 
Women's doubles

Mixed doubles

BWF International Challenge/Series 
Women's doubles

Mixed doubles

  BWF International Challenge tournament
  BWF International Series tournament
  BWF Future Series tournament

References

External links 
 

Living people
1993 births
Sportspeople from Palmerston North
New Zealand female badminton players
New Zealand people of Hong Kong descent
New Zealand sportspeople of Chinese descent
People educated at Westlake Girls High School
Badminton players at the 2022 Commonwealth Games
Commonwealth Games competitors for New Zealand
20th-century New Zealand women
21st-century New Zealand women